Ivan Ignatyevich Savvidi (Ivan Egnates dze Savidi, also known as Ivan Savvidis; born 27 March 1959), is a Russian-Greek oligarch and politician. Savvidis is one of Russia's wealthiest men and was a member of the Russian Parliament, closely linked to the President Vladimir Putin.

Professional biography 
Savvidis was born in Santa Gruzino, Tsalka District, Georgia, to Pontic Greek immigrant parents from Dumanlı (Sanda). After serving in the Soviet Army, Savvidis was educated at the Rostov State University of Economics in Rostov-on-Don. In the 1980s and early 1990s, Savvidis was employed in various positions at the Don State Tobacco Factory. In 1992, the tobacco factory was privatised and renamed CJSC Donskoy Tabak; in the following year Savvidis was appointed as its General Director. Savvidis and his wife, Kyriaki Savvidi, are now formally the majority shareholders of Donskoy Tabak, the largest Russian tobacco company.

Between July 2002 and July 2005, Savvidis was President of FC Rostov.

As of 10 August 2012, he had acquired ownership of the Greek football team PAOK and entered the Forbes list of the richest people in the world.

In 2013, Forbes listed Savvidis as the 30th wealthiest Russian businessman in the world. In 2013 he purchased 82% of the Greek tobacco company SEKAP.

In 2015 Savvidis paid all of the club's debts to the Greek State, an amount that totalled at €10,886,811. After his exit from the tax office he stated: "I had a cup of tea that cost me 10,8 million €."

He has 19% of Mega Channel and in 2017 his Dimera Media company acquired the Pegasus Publications, which includes the newspapers of Ethnos and Imerisia. On 11 August of the same year, he bought the E Channel from businessman Philipos Vryonis and the market agreement was ratified on 21 August 2017.

In March 2018, he sold the Donskoy Tabak, together with the Greek SEKAP, to Japan Tobacco for 1.6 billion.

Real estate
In February 2013, Savvidis took over the management of the Macedonia Palace in Thessaloniki.

He has also acquired a number of historic villas of Thessaloniki (such as the Longos mansion, Villa Zardinidi etc), while his recent investment in Porto Carras reaches the half billion €.

Political career 
Savvidis was elected to the Legislative Assembly of Rostov Oblast in 1998 and 2003. In 2003, Savvidis was elected as a Deputy in the State Duma; he subsequently served as the Deputy Chairman of the Budget Committee and Taxes. In 2007, Savvidis was re-elected as a Deputy in the State Duma as a member of the party United Russia led by chairman Vladimir Putin, serving until 2011. He served as a member of the Committee International Affairs, as coordinator of Interparliamentary Relations with the Hellenic Parliament and as Deputy Chairman of the Foreign Affairs Committee of the Parliamentary Assembly of the Russia-Belarusian Union.

He has previously made positive comments about the Greek political party Syriza and has likened Alexis Tsipras to Vladimir Putin. Ivan Savvidis is accused by a section of the press of being involved with Kyriakos Velopoulos, president of the Greek Solution.

Controversies 
On 11 March 2018, during the PAOK–AEK football match at the Toumba Stadium and after PAOK had a goal ruled out for offside in the 90th minute, Savvidis entered the pitch with his bodyguards and tried to take the team off. It later surfaced that he had been carrying a handgun in a holster when he entered the pitch. The Greek Super League was subsequently suspended and Savvidis had a three-year punishment of entering football stadiums by the HFF.

In 2018, the Prime Minister of the Republic of Macedonia (today North Macedonia), Zoran Zaev, reportedly accused him of giving hundreds of thousands of euros to individuals and groups who participated in the riots against the Prespa agreement in Skopje. Savvidis with an official statement denied these accusations.

Personal life and community service 

Savvidis is President of the Federation of Greek Communities of Russia, and was a key figure in pushing for the newly created region by the World Council of Hellenes Abroad in the Black Sea countries.

In 2022, during the humanitarian crisis in Ukraine, Savvidis ordered his associates to prepare around 487 rooms available at the Porto Carras resort in Chalkidiki within northern Greece in order to hose refugees of the country during this time.
 

He is married to Kyriaki Savvidi and has two sons, George (Giorgi) and Nick (Nikolai).

Awards

State 
 Order "For Merit to the Fatherland" IV degree (21 February 2008) –  for achievements in legislative activity, strengthening of Russian statehood and the development of Rostov-on-Don 
 Order of Honour (13 December 2003) –  for labor achievements and many years of diligent work  Order "For Merit to the Fatherland" II degree (6 September 1999) –  for his contribution to the socio-economic development of the city of Rostov-on-Don, and in connection with its 250th anniversary  Church 
 Order of Holy Prince Daniel of Moscow II degree (2009)
 Order of Saint Seraphim of Sarov III degree (2011)
 Orthodox Knight of the Holy Sepulchre by the Patriarchate of Jerusalem

 Public organizations 
 Medal "Patron of the Year" –  for the revival of Russian culture and the Rostov-on-Don region '' (1999–2009)

References 

Living people
1959 births
Russian people of Greek descent
Russian businesspeople
Greek football chairmen and investors
Greek volleyball chairmen and investors
Greek billionaires
FC Rostov
PAOK F.C. presidents
Georgian people of Greek descent
Pontic Greeks
Fourth convocation members of the State Duma (Russian Federation)
Fifth convocation members of the State Duma (Russian Federation)
People from Kvemo Kartli
Businesspeople in the tobacco industry
Rostov State University of Economics alumni